The School of Life Sciences, Kannur University hosts two departments, Department of Biotechnology and Microbiology, which was established in 2000 for conducting master's degree (M.Sc) courses and research (Ph.D) in Biotechnology and Microbiology. An Inter University Centre for Bioscience was also established at the department by the Higher Education Department, Government of Kerala, to be a global center of excellence for research in biological sciences. Master's degree course in computational biology was introduced in 2020.

Courses 

 M.Sc. Biotechnology
 M.Sc. Microbiology
 M.Sc. Computational Biology

Faculty 
The department have 6 tenured faculties which includes, 2 professors, 3 associate professors and 1 assistant professor. The founding head of department, Prof. M. Haridas serves as an emeritus professor, who is also the director of Inter University Center for Bioscience.

Professors 

 Sadasivan. C, M.Sc. Ph.D.
 Sreejith. K, M.Sc, M.Phil, Ph.D.
Sabu. A, M.Sc, Ph.D.
Anup Kumar Kesavan, M.Sc. Ph.D.

Emeritus Professors 

 M. Haridas, M.Sc. Ph.D.

Associate Professors 

 Jayadevi Variyar. E, M.Sc, M.Phil, Ph.D.
 Anu Augustine, M.Sc, Ph.D.

Assistant professors 

 Soumya. L, M.Sc.
Arun. B, M.Sc, Ph.D.
Aneesh Chandran, M.Sc, Ph.D.

Former faculty 

 Surekha Kuyyalil, M.Sc. Ph.D.

Research Area 

The main area of research includes Structural biology, Computational biology, Medicinal chemistry, Enzymology, Microbial technology, Bioprocess technology, Immunology, Endocrinology, and Plant molecular biology. Research findings from the department has significantly contributed for the growth of macromolecular crystallography in India.

Facilities 
The School of Life Sciences is located in Thalassery campus, which have well equipped modern classrooms, teaching and research laboratories. A new building for the School of Life Sciences in Thalassery campus will be established to advance the facilities in the microbiology and biotechnology departments. The government had already sanctioned ₹6.5 crore, out of the estimated cost of ₹18 crore for the project.

Collaborations 
The School of Life Sciences together with Inter University Center for Bioscience have active collaborations with different research Institutes and industry across the country.

Research findings 

Anti inflammatory activity of biotransformed derivatives of berberine. For the discovery of ‘Phormidin’ an inhibitor of the enzyme Fatty Acid Synthase (FAS), a potential anticancer drug, US patent has been awarded. This is the first international patent earned by the university.

International conferences organized

International Conference on Advances in Biological Sciences (ICABS) 
Organized by the Department of Biotechnology and Microbiology and the Inter University Centre for Bioscience, Kannur University, Kerala, India (15-17 March 2012 at, Kannur). ICABS witnessed a unique spectrum of scientific programmes on the most recent and exciting developments in modern biology.

International Conference on Research and Development in Biosciences (CRDB 2019) 
The International Conference on Research and Development in Biosciences (CRDB) 15-17  January, 2019,  was organized by Department of Biotechnology and Microbiology, Kannur University and co-sponsored by Kerala State Council for Science Technology and Environment. Recent advances in the frontier areas of Biological Sciences including Microbial Biotechnology, Immunotechnology, Molecular biology, Genomics and Structural Biology were the highlights of the conference.

Other events

Dr. Surekha memorial Oration 
Dr. Surekha Memorial Oration is an invited lecture held annually in the memory of former faculty in the department, Dr. Surekha. Invited lectures from eminent professors and scientists are held in the second week of August.

Lectures 

 Dr. V.P. Gangadharan, Oncologist, Lake Shore Hospital, Kochi, Kerala (16th August 2016) 
 "Evaluation of natural products for anticancer potential" by Dr. Ruby John Anto, Scientist, Rajiv Gandhi Centre for Biotechnology, Kerala (14th August 2017), 
 "Role of antiapoptotic protein BCL2 in oncogenesis and cancer therapy" by Dr. Satees C Raghavan, Professor, Indian Institute of Science (IISc), Bangalore, Karnataka (13th August 2018) 
 "The circadian clock regulate triglyceride metabolism in drosophila" by Dr. Nisha N Kannan, Assistant Professor, Indian Institute of Science Education and Research, Thiruvananthapuram, Kerala (13th August 2019) 
 "Modelling neurological disorders in pluripotent stem cells by perturbing gene regulatory networks", Dr. Divya M S, Scientist, Sree Chitra Tirunal Institute for Medical Sciences & Technology, Thiruvananthapuram, Kerala (13th August 2020) 
"Indian spices production, prospects and challenges", Dr. A. B Remashree, Director of Research, Spices Board, Ministry of Commerce and Industry, Government of India (13th August 2021)
"", Dr. Dileep K V, Scientist, Jubilee Centre for Medical Research, Kerala (13th August 2021)

References 

Kannur University
Medical colleges in Kerala